Rahmatollah Khosravi is an Iranian politician who was formerly a member of the Iranian Parliament and City Council of Tehran.

References 

1950 births
Living people
Members of the 3rd Islamic Consultative Assembly
People from Abadeh
Assembly of the Forces of Imam's Line politicians
Chairmen of City Council of Tehran
Tehran Councillors 1999–2003
National Trust Party (Iran) politicians
Islamic Association of Engineers of Iran politicians
Secretaries-General of political parties in Iran